Thomas Joseph Simmons (July 6, 1932 – April 10, 2002) was an American lawyer and politician.

Simmons was born in Renville County, Minnesota. He served in the United States Army, Simmons received his bachelor's degree from College of Saint Benedict and Saint John's University and his law degree from William Mitchell College of Law. Simmons was admitted to the Minnesota bar. He lived in Olivia, Minnesota with his wife and family. Simmons served as the Renville County Attorney. He also served in the Minnesota House of Representatives in 1971 and 1972. He died in Olivia, Minnesota.

References

1932 births
2002 deaths
People from Olivia, Minnesota
College of Saint Benedict and Saint John's University alumni
William Mitchell College of Law alumni
Military personnel from Minnesota
Minnesota lawyers
Members of the Minnesota House of Representatives